1996–97 Second League of FR Yugoslavia (Serbian: Druga Liga Jugoslavije) consisted of two groups of 18 teams.

League table

East

West

References

External sources
 Season tables at FSGZ

Yugoslav Second League seasons
Yugo
2